Richard Vincent Riordan (born 11 April 1972) is an Australian politician and businessman. He was elected to the Victorian Legislative Assembly as a Liberal Party member for Polwarth at a by-election held on 31 October 2015. This was the first Liberal Party by-election win in Victoria in thirty-five years.

Riordan is from a prominent family in Polwarth. His great-grandfather came to Polwarth as a young Englishman in the 1800s to make a new start and create a better life for his family. His paternal great-grandfather W. T Parker established himself in the community and was involved in farming, education and the environment, a tradition that lives on through his grandchildren and great-grandchildren who have all inherited his love of the land and his strong business acumen.

During 1989, he completed his Year 12 education in Calgary, Alberta, Canada as a Rotary Exchange Student and completed his Victorian Certificate of Education at Trinity College Colac in 1990. Riordan was a prefect and admitted to Monash University to undertake a Bachelor of Business Management. During this time he was very active in university politics and the Young Liberal Movement.

Upon completion of his degree in 1994 he was appointed managing director of his family hardware business. In 1999, Riordan nominated for pre-selection in the seat of Polwarth, made vacant by Ian Smith. Terry Mulder was successful and Riordan resumed his position within the family company and numerous executive positions within the Liberal Party.

He experienced one more defeat in pre-selection in 2010 before being successful in 2015.

He was re-elected at the 2018 state election. Despite the Liberal Party experiencing a swing against it, Riordan increased his primary vote, receiving in excess of 50% of the vote. Riordan was appointed Assistant Shadow Minister for Agriculture and Regional Development and Deputy Chair of The Public Accounts and Estimates Committee.

He has been very vocal about wire rope barriers and their effectiveness as  a life saving measure on country roads. He recently came under  fire for his comments after the death of a truck driver in Clifton Springs where he was accused of using a fatality for political gain. However, he was soon vindicated when his views  were supported by road transport groups.

He was managing director of his family company, which had varied retail interests. He is active in the local community, having served as director of the board of Colac Area Health.

After the Liberal party loss during the 2022 Victorian state election, Riordan announce his candidacy for the 2022 Liberal Party of Australia (Victorian Division) leadership election. A few days later he would withdraw and announce his support for Brad Battin for the leadership election.

References

External links

Parliamentary biography
 Parliamentary voting record of Richard Riordan at Victorian Parliament Tracker

1972 births
Living people
Members of the Victorian Legislative Assembly
Liberal Party of Australia members of the Parliament of Victoria
Australian businesspeople
Monash University alumni
People from Colac, Victoria
21st-century Australian politicians